The 207th Coastal Division was an infantry division of the Royal Italian Army during World War II. Royal Italian Army coastal divisions were second line divisions formed with reservists and equipped with second rate materiel. Recruited locally, they were often commanded by officers called out of retirement.

History 
The division was activated on 15 November 1941 in Palermo by reorganizing the VII Coastal Sector Command. The division was assigned to XII Army Corps, which was responsible for the defense of the western half of the island of Sicily. In January 1942 the division moved its headquarter to Agrigento. The division was responsible for the coastal defense of the coast between Sciacca and Punta Due Rocche to the East of Licata.

The division fought against units of the American Seventh Army after the allies landed on Sicily on 10 July 1943. By 16 July 1943 the division had been severely decimated and was therefore officially declared lost due to wartime events.

Organization 
 207th Coastal Division, in Agrigento
 138th Coastal Regiment
 CCCLXXX Coastal Battalion
 CCCLXXXVIII Coastal Battalion
 CDXV Coastal Battalion
 CDXVII Coastal Battalion
 CDXX Coastal Battalion
 139th Coastal Regiment, in Licata
 LXII Replacements Battalion
 CDXIX Coastal Battalion
 CCCXC Coastal Battalion
 12th Coastal Artillery Regiment
 XXXV Coastal Artillery Group (3x 105/28 and 1x 75/27 batteries)
 CXLV Coastal Artillery Group (2x 105/28 and 1x 75/34 batteries)
 CLX Coastal Artillery Group (2x 149/35 and 1x 105mm/27 batteries)
 CCXXIII Coastal Artillery Group (2x 100/22 batteries)
 CIX Machine Gun Battalion
 510th Machine Gun Company
 516th Machine Gun Company
 207th Carabinieri Section
 164th Field Post Office
 Division Services

Attached to the division:
 177th Bersaglieri Regiment
 DXXV Bersaglieri Battalion (raised by the 3rd Bersaglieri Regiment)
 DXXVI Bersaglieri Battalion (raised by the 6th Bersaglieri Regiment)
 DXXVII Bersaglieri Battalion (raised by the 2nd Bersaglieri Regiment)
 CIV Anti-tank Battalion (47/32 anti-tank guns)
 CCXXIII Artillery Group (joined the 12th Coastal Artillery Regiment when it was assigned to the division)
 LXXXVIII Guardia alla Frontiera Artillery Group (attached until the 12th Coastal Artillery Regiment joined the division)
 Armored Train 120/3/S, in Porto Empedocle (4x 120/45 Mod. 1918 naval guns, 4x 20/77 anti-aircraft guns)
 Armored Train 76/1/T, in Porto Empedocle (6x 76/40 Mod. 1916 naval guns, 4x 20/77 anti-aircraft guns)
 Armored Train 76/2/T, in Licata (4x 76/40 Mod. 1916 naval guns, 4x 20/77 anti-aircraft guns)

Commanding officers 
The division's commanding officers were:

 Generale di Divisione Antonio Calierno (15 November 1941 - 30 November 1942)
 Generale di Brigata Ottorino Schreiber (1 December 1942 - 11 July 1943)
 Generale di Brigata Augusto De Laurentiis (12 July - 16 July 1943, POW)

References 

 
 

Coastal divisions of Italy
Infantry divisions of Italy in World War II